The Kom are one of the principal ethnic groups of the North-West province of Cameroon, where traditional government institutions are very important.  The capital, Laikom, is the seat of the ruler, the Fon, and his advisors, the Quifon, who continue to be the most respected leaders despite the imposition of a central Cameroonian government.  Vincent Yuh II died in November 2017, Fon Ndzi II is the current Fon of Kom.  The Cameroonian government recognizes to some degree the authority of the Fons and local chiefs subject to them.

Kom includes most of Boyo division, including such towns as Fundong, Belo, Njinikom and Mbingo. The area can be reached from Bamenda on the so-called Ring Road.

The elaborate language and rich culture of Kom are very similar to neighbouring groups, collectively known as the Tikar. The Kom language is also called Kom or Itangikom

History
During the 19th century migration in Cameroon, most tribes moved south in search of better economic opportunities. The Kom people, who originated from upper Mbam in Tikari, moved in search of fertile soils. They first settled in Babessi. While in Babessi, their population began to grow drastically, and rapidly. The Fon of Babessi feared a possible attack from the Kom people. He then tricked the Fon of kom (Njinabo I) into believing that the increase in their male population may some day lead to them being overthrown. The fon of Kom believed this and subsequently accepted his proposal to burn all the healthy men in two separate rooms.

After the act was committed, the Fon of Kom realized that he had been tricked.  The Babessi Fon had built a secret door for his men to escape when the fire started.  Unable to bear the loss and betrayal, the Fon of Kom committed suicide by hanging himself. He died without a son.  Legend has it that a python appeared and led the people of Kom to their present settlement in Laikom. For more information on Kom see Nkwi(2012 and 2015)

Government and politics
The Kom tribe covers ¾ of the Boyo division. The capital of Kom is Laikom, and it is made up of over 43 villages. The tribe is ruled by a king or Fon (Fondom) and followed by the traditional parliament/legislative assembly ( kwifoyn). In Kom as elsewhere in the Bamenda Grassfields,  it is the executive arm of the traditional government.The system of government of checks and balances suggests the democratice process of an indigenous African civilisation. However, Its job is to make sure that the Fon's orders are followed to the letter. Besides the traditional prime minister is the counsel of elders (nchidoh). Unlike any other elderly person in the Kom inddigenous society, this set of people can easily be recognized by the red feather they carry on their hats. After the nchidoh, is the village head. He is somehow also the spiritual leader of the villages. He takes orders from the Kwifoyn and implements them.

Economics
Agriculture and trade is the predominant thing done in Kom in order to earn a living. In the field of agriculture, the people produce food crops like, sweet and Irish potato, beans, corn, coco yams. Coffee is the only cash crop produced in Kom. In trade, there are many cooperative unions that help in the marketing of coffee. Many Kom retailers buy stuff from places like Nigeria, Bamenda and Baffoussam. Some buy right from Dubai; to retail in the main towns of Fundong, Njinikom and Belo.

Society, culture, customs
Kom society is patriarchal. Males hold the vast majority of power and privilege, while females labour mostly in domestic roles in kitchens and on farms. A man's power and wealth is measured by the number of his wives. Polygamy is a thing of pride. This makes a man with one wife voiceless in a men's gathering. Girls get married as young as 15 years old.

Although Kom males hold most of the power in day-to-day affairs, Kom society is matrilineal in matters of succession. In this way, Kom society differs significantly from other tribes of Cameroon. Lineage in the Kom culture continues on the side of the mother and not the father in such a way that when an adult Kom male dies, ownership of his property including his compound, wives and children is transferred to his nephew (son of his sister) and not his own son. The process of matrilineal succession in Kom society is more complex if a deceased male did not have a nephew to inherit his property. In this case, succession is continued on the side of first cousin. As of the late 20th century, this practice is growing obsolete.

Kom society also places a great emphasis on respect for elders.

There are numerous dance groups like the Njang and chong, which performs in many occasions including funerals. Prince Yerima Afo’o kom and Ateh Bazor are two of Kom's most prominent folklore musicians.

Njang Dance performances

References

External links

Kompeople.org

Ethnic groups in Cameroon